Le nabab is a three-act opéra comique by Fromental Halévy to a libretto by Eugène Scribe.

The title refers to a Nawab or Indian notable. The opera was the last collaboration of Scribe and Halévy, which began in 1835 with La Juive, Halévy's greatest success. It premiered in Paris on 1 September 1853.

The opera had 38 performances and appears not to have been revived.

Roles
Dora soprano – Caroline Miolan-Carvalho
Lord Evendale tenor – Charles-Auguste-Marie Ponchard
Clifford baritone – Joseph-Antoine-Charles Couderc

Synopsis
Place: India and England
Time:

The Commissioner, Lord Evendale, bored with his life and especially with his wife, contemplates suicide. His doctor suggests he take a year's sabbatical. Before he leaves for England, Evendale arranges for the passage to England of Dora, an orphan girl.

In England, Evendale works in disguise for Dora's uncle and wins her heart. In the third act, it is revealed that Lady Evendale had married Evendale's doctor in their youth. Her bigamy frees Evendale to marry Dora.

References

Sources

Jordan, Ruth, Fromental Halévy: His Life and Music, 1799-1862, (1996), 

Operas by Fromental Halévy
1853 operas
Opéras comiques
Operas
French-language operas
Libretti by Eugène Scribe